The  was a class of four reefer ships of the Imperial Japanese Navy (IJN), serving during and after World War II. Eleven vessels were planned under the Maru 4 Programme, Maru Rin Programme (Ship #261–263), and Kai-Maru 5 Programme (Ship #5401–5407); however, only four vessels were completed.

Construction

In 1939, the IJN planned two food supply ships for China Area Fleet under the Maru 4 Programme. One was the 600-ton type Nosaki (initial named Support ship No. 4007), the other the 1,000-ton type Kinesaki (initial named Support ship No. 4006). The Navy then ordered several more ships to the design of the Kinesaki; these became the Hayasaki, Shirasaki, and Arasaki. The Navy intended to order several more ships of this design by 1942, but Japan's worsening situation in the war by this stage led to the abandonment of these plans.

Service
The Kinesaki served in the Central Pacific Area, the Hayasaki in the Southwest Area, the Shirasaki in the Northeast Area, and the Arasaki in the Southeast Area. They also undertook convoy escort operations. The Kinesaki was sunk in March 1945, while the other ships of the class survived the war.

Ships in class

Footnotes

Bibliography
 , History of the Pacific War Vol. 51 The truth histories of the Japanese Naval Vessels part-2, Gakken (Japan), 2005, .
 The Maru Special, Japanese Naval Vessels No. 34 Japanese Auxiliary ships, Ushio Shobō (Japan), 1979.
 Shizuo Fukui, Collection of writings by Sizuo Fukui Vol. 10, "Stories of Japanese Support Vessels", Kōjinsha (Japan), 1993, .
 Senshi Sōsho Vol. 31, Naval armaments and war preparation (1), "Until November 1941", Asagumo Simbun (Japan), 1969.
 Senshi Sōsho Vol. 88, Naval armaments and war preparation (2), "And after the outbreak of war", Asagumo Simbun (Japan), 1975.

World War II naval ships of Japan
Auxiliary ships of the Imperial Japanese Navy
Auxiliary transport ship classes
Ships built by Hitachi Zosen Corporation
Ships built by Osaka Iron Works